Lin Po Heung is a Hong Kong female fencer. At the 2012 Summer Olympics she competed in the Women's foil, defeated 10–13 in the first round.

References

Hong Kong female foil fencers
Living people
Olympic fencers of Hong Kong
Fencers at the 2012 Summer Olympics
Fencers at the 2016 Summer Olympics
Asian Games medalists in fencing
Fencers at the 2010 Asian Games
1985 births
Fencers at the 2014 Asian Games
Asian Games bronze medalists for Hong Kong
Medalists at the 2010 Asian Games
Medalists at the 2014 Asian Games